Borden Farm may refer to:

in Canada
 Borden Farm, Nepean, Ontario, a neighborhood

in the United States
Borden Farm (Portsmouth, Rhode Island), listed on the NRHP in Newport County, Rhode Island

See also
Borden House (disambiguation)